"Only One Word Comes To Mind" is a song by Biffy Clyro from their 2004 album, Infinity Land. It is the third single from the album and their tenth single overall. It reached number 27 on the UK Singles Chart and number seven on the Scottish Singles Chart.

Track listings
Songs and lyrics by Simon Neil. Music by Biffy Clyro.

CD (BBQ384CD)
 "Only One Word Comes To Mind (Radio Edit)" – 3:11
 "Drown In A Natural Light" – 4:09
 "Gently"  – 3:53

DVD (BBQ384DVD)
 "Only One Word Comes To Mind" (Video)
 "The Making Of..." (Photo Gallery)

7" (BBQ384)
 "Only One Word Comes To Mind (Radio Edit)" – 3:11
 "Tradition Feed" – 1:04

Personnel
 Simon Neil – guitar, vocals
 James Johnston – bass, vocals
 Ben Johnston – drums, vocals
 Chris Sheldon – producer

Charts

References

External links
 "Only One Word Comes To Mind" Lyrics
 "Only One Word Comes To Mind" Guitar Tablature
 

2005 singles
Biffy Clyro songs
Songs written by Simon Neil
Song recordings produced by Chris Sheldon
Beggars Banquet Records singles
2004 songs